The 1995–96 Liga Alef season saw Maccabi Kafr Kanna and Hapoel Ashkelon promoted to Liga Artzit as the respective winners of the North and South division.

At the bottom, Hapoel Givat Olga, Maccabi Or Akiva (from North division), Hapoel Marmorek and Hapoel Merhavim (from South division) were all relegated to Liga Bet.

North Division

South Division

References
Liga Alef - South (Article No. 180983) Haaretz, 26.5.96, Haaretz Archive 

Liga Alef seasons
3
Israel